Leigh Creek is a former coal-mining town in eastern central South Australia. At the 2016 census, Leigh Creek had a population of 245, a 55% decrease from 550 in the previous census in 2011.

Situated to the west of the northern Flinders Ranges, the current town is 13 km further south than the original town—it was moved in 1982 to allow for the expansion of the mine.  As a result, most facilities and buildings in the town are only a little over thirty years old, and with relatively modern designs.

The mine and associated railway station are named Telford.

History 
The area was named Leigh's Creek after its first settler, Harry Leigh, in 1856. Coal was discovered and small quantities mined from 1888 from an underground mine. The town to support the mine at that time was called Copley, after William Copley, an MP and Commissioner of Crown Lands. However the coal was not mined in a significant commercial manner until 1943 in an effort to make South Australia more self-sufficient for its energy needs, with less dependence on New South Wales. The premier Thomas Playford saw the need to be seen not to rely on interstate energy if he was to attract business to South Australia.

Coal mine

The former open cut mine operation was for low-grade, sub-bitumenous black coal which is frequently referred to as hard brown coal or just brown coal. It was transported 250 km by rail to power stations outside Port Augusta on the east side of Spencer Gulf. The coal occurs in several nested bowl-shaped seams, each several metres thick. The coalfield at Leigh Creek was operated by Alinta Energy and produced over 2.5 million tonnes a year of coal. Alinta Energy also operated the power stations at Port Augusta which were the only remaining coal-fired generators in South Australia, and the only users of coal from Leigh Creek.

Downsizing and closure
Since the early 1990s, more changes occurred in Leigh Creek. Massive restructuring of mining operations resulted in the reduction of a workforce of over 750 to about 200. The township also became a lot smaller. The population dropped from about 2500 in 1987 to less than 250 in the year 2016.

On 30 July 2015, Alinta Energy announced they were bringing the closure dates of all three facilities forward by 12 months, and now intended to no longer operate them past March 2017 and could shut them down as early as March 2016. On 7 October 2015, it was confirmed that the Leigh Creek mining operations would cease on 17 November 2015.

Leigh Creek Energy Project 

In 2015 the media announced that another coal project at Leigh Creek was in the planning process. Leigh Creek Energy Project (LCEP), proposed by the ASX listed company Leigh Creek Energy, intends to extract gas from Leigh Creek's coal seams by drilling injection and extraction wells and igniting the coal underground using a process known as in-situ coal gasification. The company has proposed that the gas would then be exported to Australia's eastern states via existing pipeline networks. An additional plant to produce ammonium nitrate fertilizer and explosives for use in the mining sector would also be built adjacent to the coal gasification plant.

Environment

The Aroona Sanctuary is one of the best examples of environmental rehabilitation in Australia. By 1985, the lands of the Aroona Sanctuary were badly degraded. Massive numbers of rabbits and feral goats depleted the native vegetation. The vegetation losses led to extensive sheet and gully erosion. Widespread soil erosion also led to rapid silting of Aroona Dam. The lands around Leigh Creek showed serious sign of desertification. Overgrazing and the unrestricted use of 4-wheel vehicles, motorbikes and horses also added to land degradation. For example, the local Pony Club occupied an area near Windy Creek. A large number of horses were left grazing uncontrolled and totally destroyed all vegetation. "Dust devils" originating in this area were visible from a long distance. Sand drifts started to occur and rainwater was no longer able to penetrate into the soil layer, because of the talcum powder like structure of the soil surface.

A large-scale environmental rehabilitation project was started in late 1985, under the direction of Beat Odermatt, Environmental Scientist for ETSA. Rehabilitation was done by destroying rabbits and feral goats and by undertaking erosion control works, such as disk pitting and the construction of water velocity reducers. The removal of rabbits and feral goats helped the native vegetation to return. Over 1 million trees and shrubs emerged in the degraded area and silting of waterways and Aroona Dam was drastically reduced.

In 1995, the Government of South Australia declared the area around Aroona Dam a Flora and Fauna Sanctuary. Within less than 10 years, an extremely badly degraded area had recovered to a situation where it could again support a diverse range of native plants and wildlife. The programme provided proof that degraded lands can be rehabilitated. It is one of the best environmental land rehabilitations in arid areas.

In the meantime, a captive breeding programme of yellow-footed rock-wallabies at Monarto Safari Park in South Australia had become too successful. The Royal Zoological Society of South Australia and scientists from the SA Department of Environment and Heritage were looking for a suitable site for the world's first free release of captive yellow-footed rock-wallabies. The Aroona Dam Sanctuary was chosen as the best suitable site. Yellow-footed rock-wallabies once populated the Aroona Dam area. They became extinct in the area because of competition from feral goats and rabbits and predation from feral foxes and cats. Hunting of wallabies by "local yokels" had destroyed the last remaining animals. A programme was initiated to control potential predators such as feral cats and foxes. In 1996, a small number of captive-bred yellow-footed rock-wallabies was released in the Aroona Sanctuary. The released animals were closely monitored with the help of radio collars and keen volunteers and scientists. Monitoring was undertaken with the help of a large range of people, such as local school students, mine workers and scientists from many other Zoos around Australia and the United States of America.

Various stages of the Aroona Dam Sanctuary project became widely recognized. The project was awarded 3 SA State Landcare Awards and a Mining Industry Award for Environmental Excellency. The project had become one of Australia's most successful and most awarded environmental rehabilitation projects. The Aroona Bio-Diversity Project was also supported by Landcare National Heritage grants from the Commonwealth Government, by active support from adjoining landholders and is currently administered and funded by NRG Flinders.

Land degradation has remained the biggest single environmental problem in Australia. Land degradation is also one of the biggest factors contributing to silting of rivers and creeks in Australia and subsequent water shortages in many areas.

Climate

In popular culture
 Leigh Creek Road is referred to in the John Schumann song of the same name on his 1993 album True Believers.
It features in the 2022 movie, Gold starring Zac Efron.

References

Leigh Creek: An Oasis in the Desert, Flinders Ranges Research 1997 (Nic Klaassen)
Parliamentary Research Manager, Dr John Weste, March 2011.
Leigh Creek Heritage, R Cameron Wilton.
Brown, Mines of South Australia, p. 346
Leigh Creek Manager, R Cameron Wilton, 2011–2012, Leigh Creek Town Manager, Robert Stack, 2013-current

External links
Dept of Mineral Resources SA – Commodities – Coal
South Australian History – Leigh Creek
South Australian History – Coal
Flinders Power

Mining towns in South Australia
Far North (South Australia)
Places in the unincorporated areas of South Australia